Lives of Girls and Women is a short story cycle by Nobel Prize–winning author Alice Munro, published by McGraw-Hill Ryerson in 1971. All of the stories chronicle the life of a single character, Del Jordan, and the book has been characterized as a novel by some critics as a result.

The cycle serves as a coming of age story for Del Jordan growing up first on the outskirts, and later in the centre, of the small, southern Ontario town of Jubilee. Del is portrayed as something of an outsider, unsatisfied with small-town life though unwilling to acknowledge the similarities between herself and her mother who also seeks to expand her mind beyond the limited experiences of Jubilee.

The cycle is often cited as concerning many feminist ideas and it is in this context that the text deals primarily with female characters, with only a few male figures playing important roles.

A television adaptation of the book, starring Tanya Allen as Del and Wendy Crewson as her mother Ada, aired on CBC Television in 1994.

Stories
 "The Flats Road"
 "Heirs of the Living Body"
 "Princess Ida"
 "Age of Faith"
 "Changes and Ceremonies"
 "Lives of Girls and Women"
 "Baptizing"
 "Epilogue: The Photographer"

References

External links
 A Photo Essay of the similarities between Jubilee and Wingham
 

1971 short story collections
Short story collections by Alice Munro
CBC Television original films
1994 television films
1994 films
Ryerson Press books
Canadian bildungsromans
Canadian drama television films
1990s English-language films
1990s Canadian films